Wesley Center is a ghost town in Jewell County, Kansas, United States.

References

Further reading

External links
 Jewell County maps: Current, Historic, KDOT

Unincorporated communities in Jewell County, Kansas
Unincorporated communities in Kansas